is a Japanese manga artist. He is best known for his works Kenkō Zenrakei Suieibu Umishō and Sankarea: Undying Love, both of which were adapted into anime television series.

Works
  (2000–2002, serialized in Young Magazine Uppers, Kodansha)
  (2002–2004, serialized in Uppers, Kodansha)
 Concerto (2005-2011, short stories serialized in Young Animal, Hakusensha)
  (2006–2008, serialized in Weekly Shonen Magazine, Kodansha)
 Love Fool (2009, one-shot published in Tsubomi volume 1, Hobunsha)
  (2009-2014, serialized in Bessatsu Shōnen Magazine, Kodansha)
Kaijū-iro no Shima (かいじゅう色の島, Monster-Colored Island) (2018–present, Young Dragon Age, Fujimi Shobo)

References

External links
 
Official website 

 
1977 births
Living people
Manga artists from Mie Prefecture
People from Mie Prefecture